Rawlin Mallock (c. 1649 – 1691), of Cockington, Devon, was an English politician.

He was a Member (MP) of the Parliament of England for Ashburton on 9 March 1677 and for Totnes in 1689.

References

1649 births
1691 deaths
Members of the Parliament of England (pre-1707) for Totnes
Members of the Parliament of England for Ashburton
English MPs 1661–1679
English MPs 1689–1690